The Florida Gators men's basketball team represents the University of Florida in the sport of basketball.  The Gators compete in NCAA Division I's Southeastern Conference (SEC). Home games are played in the Exactech Arena at the Stephen C. O'Connell Center on the university's Gainesville, Florida campus.

While the University of Florida's men's basketball team first took the court in 1915, the program did not receive much support from the university for several decades. The basketball team did not have a permanent home court with adequate spectator space until the Florida Gymnasium opened in 1949, did not hire a full-time basketball coach until Norm Sloan in 1960, and did not play in a modern arena until the O'Connell Center opened in 1980. Early highlights included the program's first postseason appearance in the 1969 National Invitation Tournament with the Gators' first All-American Neal Walk, a run to the Sweet Sixteen during its first NCAA tournament appearance in 1987 under head coach Norm Sloan, and another surprise tournament run to the 1994 Final Four under head coach Lon Kruger. However, consistent success was elusive, and the Gators often found themselves in the bottom half of the SEC basketball standings.

The trajectory of Florida's basketball program changed with the hiring of head coach Billy Donovan in 1996. After having made five NCAA Tournament appearances and having won only one regular season SEC championship and zero SEC tournaments in 78 seasons of basketball before his arrival, the Gators won seven SEC regular season championships and four SEC tournament championships, appeared in 14 NCAA Tournaments, reached four Final Fours, and won back-to-back national championships (2006 and 2007) during Donovan's 19 seasons in Gainesville before he left to coach in the NBA in 2015.

Todd Golden became the Gators' head basketball coach in March 2022.

Schedule overview 
The college basketball season begins in early November, and the non-conference portion of the schedule typically runs until the end of the calendar year. The Gators usually compete in a cross-regional tournament against other top programs, schedule a game or two against other quality opponents in Gainesville or on the road, and play their annual game against in-state rival Florida State before the conference portion of the schedule begins.

The 18-game Southeastern Conference (SEC) slate usually tips off around the beginning of the calendar year. The schedule consists of home-and-home games against five SEC teams mixed in with single games against each of the other eight SEC teams followed by the conference tournament. Florida has built in-conference rivalries with Kentucky and Tennessee since the Gators began consistently competing for conference titles in the 1990s.

History

Early years

The modern University of Florida (UF) was created when the Florida Legislature passed the Buckman Act of 1905, which consolidated four predecessor institutions into a new flagship university that opened its new Gainesville campus in 1906. The school sponsored its first varsity basketball team during the 1915-16 school year under head football coach C. J. McCoy, who led the basketball team to a 5–1 record against small colleges and local athletic clubs. The program went on hiatus during World War I and next took the court during the 1919–20 school year, though without an officially designated coach. Head football coach William G. Kline was assigned to coach basketball during the 1920-21 school year, when the team moved into their new home at recently completed University Gymnasium.

The "New Gym" and Alligator Alley
By the mid-1920s, the basketball team had outgrown the small brick University Gymnasium, which had been designed to serve as a student recreation center and had very little spectator space. A larger wooden structure was built directly adjacent to the University Gym in 1928. While it was officially known as "Building R", it was commonly called the "New Gym." The New Gym was intended to be a temporary home for the basketball team until the school could afford a more permanent structure. However, funds soon became scarce with the coming of the Great Depression, and university president John J. Tigert's main focus was the financing and construction of Florida Field, the new football stadium which opened in 1930. Plans for a larger brick gymnasium were drawn up in 1940, but construction was delayed by World War II, and the Gators finally moved to the Florida Gymnasium (also known as Alligator Alley) during the 1949–50 season.

Southeastern Conference membership
In December 1932, the University of Florida joined the Southeastern Conference as one of its 13 charter members. While the school would find athletic success in some sports, Florida's basketball team would spend most of the first half-century of SEC play in the bottom half of the standings, as the Gators finished the season higher than fourth in the league on only four occasions over the program's first fifty years in the SEC (1933 to 1983). Until 1960, the university continued the practice of assigning coaches from other sports to lead the basketball team, including head baseball coaches Brady Cowell, Ben Clemons and Sam McAllister, head football coach Josh Cody, and football assistants Spurgeon Cherry and John Mauer. This was common practice at most SEC schools apart from Kentucky well into the 1940s and 1950s, and some of Florida's coaches had experience in the sport, as Cody had previously coached basketball at Clemson and Vanderbilt and Mauer had previously coached basketball at Kentucky and Tennessee. However, none of these part-time coaches were able to build the Gators into consistent contenders in conference play.

The 1960s and 1970s: Sloan and some success
In hopes of breathing life into the program, 34-year-old Citadel head coach Norm Sloan was hired as Florida's first full-time head basketball coach for the 1960–61 season. Sloan's first team notched the Gators' first winning conference record in eight years, and his second repeated the feat. Overall, his Florida squads compiled a record of 85–63 in six seasons during the 1960s, including the Gators' first regular season win over long-dominant Kentucky in SEC play.  Sloan's Gators did not receive a postseason tournament invitation during his tenure, as tournament fields were smaller at the time and only conference champions received NCAA bids. Nonetheless, according to Florida historian Norm Carlson, Sloan "elevated the Gators basketball program from a seldom competitive program and built the grass roots."  Sloan left Florida after failing to receive the support of then Athletic director Ray Graves, to coach at his alma mater North Carolina State after the 1965–66 season.

Tommy Bartlett succeeded Sloan as head coach, and his first season as head coach in 1966-67 was the program's most successful to date. The Gators with a record of 21-4 finished 2nd in the SEC to Tennessee who beat them twice during the regular season.Florida was ranked in the AP top 10 for the first time earning a number 10 ranking on January 9, 1967 and then a number 8 ranking the next week on January 16. Florida notched the school's first 20-win campaign on the strength of winning their final eight games of the year by an average of 19 plus points per game. Ironically at the time the SEC would only permit the league champion to play in the post season and having finished second, they lost to league champion Tennessee twice and were not invited to a post-season tournament. Bartlett's squads finished fifth and third in conference play the following seasons. Led by the program's first All-American in center Neal Walk (the only Gator to have his number retired) and forward Andy Owens, the 1968-69 Gators received a bid to the 1969 National Invitation Tournament, the first postseason appearance in program history. After Walk and Owens went on to play professional basketball, Bartlett could not sustain the level of talent in recruiting, and team performance declined thereafter, with four straight losing campaigns leading to his dismissal.  John Lotz, a respected assistant under North Carolina's Dean Smith, succeeded Bartlett in 1973–74.  Lotz's Gators peaked with a 17–9 overall record and a fourth-place conference finish (10–8 SEC) in 1976–77, but trailed off to consecutive last place conference finishes in 1978-79 and 1979–80, leading to his dismissal.

The 1980s: Sloan returns, success and scandal
The modern era of Florida basketball began in 1980, when the team moved into their current home, the O'Connell Center. Despite being only 30 years old, Florida Gym had not aged well. By the mid-1970s, Florida was the only basketball program in the SEC without a modern arena. The university built the O'Connell Center (which quickly gained the nickname "The O'Dome") as the new home for all of the university's indoor sports programs, and it proved to be a boon across several sports.

The new facility improved the basketball program in several ways, including helping to convince Norm Sloan to return to Gainesville after a successful 14-year tenure at North Carolina State which included an undefeated season in 1972–73 and an NCAA championship in 1974. Sloan later said that he'd always enjoyed his first stint at Florida, and had always been more than willing to return if the university built a more modern arena.

Sloan's second stint at Florida was easily the most successful period in program history until the late 1990s. That success was in large part because Sloan persuaded several top Florida high school basketball players—such as Gainesville's Vernon Maxwell and Brandon's Dwayne Schintzius—to stay in-state instead of attending schools with more basketball tradition. After four years of rebuilding, Sloan led the Gators to the 1984 NIT, which was only the second postseason appearance in school history. They would make the NIT again in 1985 and 1986, reaching the NIT semi-finals in 1986.  In 1987, shooting guard Vernon Maxwell led the team to the school's first ever NCAA Tournament appearance, advancing all the way to the Sweet 16. Sloan coached the team to 20-win seasons and NCAA tournament appearances again the following two years, and led the Gators to the school's first-ever SEC regular season title in 1989 behind center Dwayne Schintzius.

However, after a drug scandal involving Maxwell and an NCAA investigation for various rules violations, Sloan and his coaching staff were forced to resign on October 31, 1989, just days before the start of the 1989–90 season.  Former Tennessee coach Don DeVoe was brought in as the interim coach, but the defending SEC champions struggled to a 7–21 record. In September 1990, the NCAA sentenced the program to two years' probation for numerous major violations dating back to 1985. Their 1987 and 1988 NCAA Tournament appearances were erased from the record books due to Maxwell being retroactively declared ineligible for secretly taking money from a sports agent, and Sloan was slapped with a five-year show-cause penalty that effectively ended his coaching career.  The most severe penalty in the long run, however, was a reduction to 13 total scholarships in 1991–92 and 14 in 1992–93, which affected the program for several years. Draconian as those penalties were, the NCAA said that it would have banned the Gators from postseason play and live television in 1990–91 had Sloan still been coach.

Lon Kruger era 
Lon Kruger, former head coach at Kansas State, took over the program before the 1990–91 season.  Despite the probation he inherited, Kruger slowly brought the team to increased success and reached the NIT semifinals in his second year as coach.  In 1993–94, the pieces fell into place for Florida to have their best season ever at that time.  Behind Andrew DeClercq and Dametri Hill, the Gators went to their first Final Four following a dramatic victory over UConn where Donyell Marshall missed two free throws with no time on the clock to force overtime, where the Gators eventually prevailed.  They lost to Duke in the national semifinal, 70–65.  The next year, they returned to the NCAA tournament, but were eliminated in the first round.  Kruger's final season in 1995–1996 resulted in a losing record, and he left to coach at Illinois.

Billy Donovan era 
Florida's Athletic Director, Jeremy Foley, looking for a young coach with a proven track record, hired 30-year-old Billy Donovan, then at Marshall, as Kruger's replacement.  His recruiting prowess was evident early, bringing future NBA star Jason Williams with him from Marshall and having early recruiting classes with future NBA players Mike Miller, Udonis Haslem, and Matt Bonner, among others.  The Gators made the NCAA tournament every year from 1999 to 2007, a nine-year streak that is the school record, and the sixth-longest NCAA Tournament streak.

Rebuilding to a Final Four 

Donovan's first two seasons at Florida proved to be the two worst during his tenure at Florida.  The Gators posted a two-year win–loss record of 27–32, missing postseason play entirely in his first season, and losing in the first round of the NIT in his second season.  These were the last losing records that the Gators suffered until 2014–15.

In his third season, however, Donovan's Gators finished the season with an overall record of 22–9, and earned the No. 6 seed in the West Regional of the 1999 NCAA tournament.  The Gators defeated Penn and Weber State to advance to the Sweet Sixteen in Phoenix, where they were upset by No. 10 seed Gonzaga.

Donovan took his Gators on a memorable run during his fourth season in Gainesville.  The Gators finished the season 29–8, including winning a share of the SEC championship.  In the 2000 SEC tournament, however, the Gators were upset in the second round by Auburn.  Florida received the No. 5 seed in the East Regional of the 2000 NCAA tournament, and swept through the region by beating Butler, Illinois, Duke, and Oklahoma State to reach the Final Four.  In the national semifinals, Florida knocked off North Carolina to advance to their first NCAA national championship game, before losing to heavily favored and top seeded Michigan State.<ref>Kevin Brockway, " Top 25 Gator teams: No.18 1999–2000 Men's basketball", The Gainesville Sun (June 7, 2009).  Retrieved June 17, 2011.</ref>

Over the next five years the Gators went to the NCAA Tournament every year, but they found themselves upset victims five straight times in the first or second round.  In the 2001 NCAA tournament, Florida received the No. 3 seed in the South Region.  They defeated No. 14 Western Kentucky in the first round, but they were then upset by the No. 11 seed, Temple.

The following year, in 2002, the Gators received the No. 5 seed in the Midwest Region of the 2002 NCAA tournament.  They were knocked off in the first round by No. 12 seed Creighton.  The 2003 Florida Gators finished the season 24–7, and received the No. 2 seed in the South Region of the 2003 NCAA tournament.  The Gators easily defeated Sam Houston State in the first round, but were then upset by No. 7 seed Michigan State in the second round.  In 2004, the Gators were the No. 5 seed in the East Rutherford Regional of the 2003–2004 NCAA tournament, but were upset in the first round by the No. 12 seed, Manhattan.

The 2004–05 team had the distinction of being the first to garner an automatic bid to the NCAA Tournament, when it defeated Kentucky in the 2005 SEC tournament championship.  The Gators subsequently received the No. 4 seed in the Syracuse Regional of the 2004–2005 NCAA tournament.  They knocked off the No. 13 seed, Ohio in the first round, but lost to No. 5 seed Villanova in the second round.

 2005–06 NCAA national championship season 

The 2005–06 team began the season unranked and went on a 17–0 winning streak for the best start in school history, surprising many with a young (four sophomores and one junior) squad following the graduation of David Lee and the departures of Matt Walsh and Anthony Roberson to the NBA.  The trio accounted for 60 percent of their offense in 2005. The team faded late in the regular season, losing its last 3 games in February and entering the postseason with a 24–6 record, yet still managed to win its second consecutive SEC tournament championship.

The Gators entered the 2006 NCAA Division I men's basketball tournament as a No. 3 seed with a 27–6 record, and ranked No. 10 by the AP.  They beat No. 14 seed South Alabama and No. 11 seed Milwaukee to advance to the Minneapolis regional.  There, the Gators defeated the No. 7 seed Georgetown Hoyas and upset the No. 1 seed Villanova Wildcats 75–62 to avenge their loss in the previous year's tournament and move on to their second Final Four under Donovan.

Florida defeated the upstart George Mason Patriots, the No. 11 seed from the Washington, D.C. regional, by a score of 73–58 in the national semifinals in Indianapolis.  On April 3, 2006, the Gators defeated the UCLA Bruins 73–57 in the national final to win the school's first men's basketball NCAA Championship.  The University of Florida Athletic Association then purchased the floor used in Indianapolis for the Final Four, and installed it in the O'Connell Center.

 2006–07 NCAA national championship season 

The Gators returned all five starters from their 2006 championship team to begin the 2006–07 basketball season ranked as the preseason No. 1 in both major media polls, a first for the Gators. The Gators locked up the SEC Championship relatively early in the 2006–07 season and were in possession of a 24–2 record before going on a late-February 1–3 skid that mirrored their 0–3 run a year earlier. For the second season in a row, the losses in February would be their last.

Florida entered the 2007 NCAA Division I men's basketball tournament as the No. 1 overall seed in the tournament, and they advanced to the Final Four after wins in the regional against No. 5 seed Butler and No. 3 seed Oregon.  In a rematch of the 2006 title game, the Gators again eliminated the UCLA Bruins in the national semifinal.  Florida defeated the Ohio State Buckeyes 84–75, in a rematch of a game they won 86–60 three months earlier, to become the first team since the 1991–92 Duke Blue Devils to win back-to-back national championships and the first college team ever to repeat as national champions with the same starting line-up. The University of Florida also has the distinction of being the only school in NCAA history to have won both the basketball and football national championships in the same season (won the football championship in January 2007, which was the 2006 season) and the only school in NCAA history to win a combined four national championships in three seasons (football in 2006 and 2008 and basketball in 2006 and 2007).

Following the 2006–07 season, three of the Gators' starting five were drafted among the first ten picks in the first round of the 2007 NBA draft: Al Horford (third), Corey Brewer (seventh) and Joakim Noah (ninth).  Taurean Green and Chris Richard were both selected in the second round.  Also during this season, Donovan passed Sloan as the winningest coach in school history.

 2008–2010: Rebuilding 

In the aftermath of the Gators second NCAA championship, Donovan accepted the head coaching position for the NBA's Orlando Magic on May 31, 2007.  On June 3, however, it was disclosed that Donovan asked to be released from his contract with the Magic, which was announced when he was reintroduced as the Gators head coach on June 7.

The Gators failed to qualify for the NCAA Tournament in 2008 and 2009.  The Gators were eliminated by UMass in the semi-finals of the 2008 National Invitation Tournament.  The following season, the Gators were eliminated by Penn State in a quarter-final game of the 2009 National Invitation Tournament.  In 2010, the Gators received an invitation to the 2010 NCAA men's basketball tournament as a No. 10 seed, but they were eliminated in the first round by No. 7 seed BYU in double overtime.

 2011–2013: Three straight Elite Eight appearances 

In the 2011 NCAA Division I men's basketball tournament, the Gators were the No. 2 seed in the Southeast region after winning the SEC Championship, after being defeated in the 2011 SEC men's basketball tournament championship game to Kentucky, and finishing with a 26–7 record. They played their two first games in Tampa, Florida.  In the Second Round of the Tournament, Florida beat No. 15 seed, UC Santa Barbara Gauchos.  In the third round, the Gators defeated the No. 7 seed, the UCLA Bruins to advance to the Sweet Sixteen in New Orleans.  On March 24, 2011, the Gators got some revenge by defeating the No. 3 seed, BYU, who had knocked them out of the NCAA Tournament the year before, by a score of 83–74 in overtime to advance to the Elite Eight for the first time since 2007.  Their tournament run ended there as they were stunned in the Regional Final against No. 8 seed Butler in overtime.

In the 2012 NCAA Division I men's basketball tournament, the Gators were the No. 7 seed in the West Region after losing in the 2012 SEC men's basketball tournament semifinals to Kentucky, finishing with an overall record of 23–10.  Florida defeated the No. 10 seed, Virginia, and the No. 15 seed, Norfolk State, to advance to the Sweet 16 in Phoenix.  They defeated No. 3 seed Marquette in an upset to advance to the Elite Eight, but their run ended when they were defeated by the No. 4 seed, Louisville, 72–68, after blowing a 65–54 lead with 8:14 remaining in the game.

The 2012–13 Gators finished the regular season with an overall record of 24–6, and won the SEC Championship with a conference record of 14–4. During the regular season, Billy Donovan notched his 400th career win as the head coach of the Gators over Missouri. After losing in the final of the 2013 SEC men's basketball tournament to Mississippi, they entered the 2013 NCAA Division I men's basketball tournament as the No. 3 seed in the South Region.  Florida defeated the No. 14 seed Northwestern State 79–47 in the first round, and advanced to the Sweet Sixteen after soundly beating the No. 11 seed, Minnesota, 78–64.  The Gators then defeated Florida Gulf Coast, No. 15 seed, in the Sweet Sixteen 62–50.  But once again, their run ended in the Elite Eight, this time against fourth seeded Michigan, who handily defeated the Gators, 79–59.  The Gators became the first team since the expansion of the tournament in 1951 to lose in the Elite Eight in three consecutive seasons.

Florida is the only program in the nation to have advanced as far as the Elite Eight in each of those seasons from 2011–2013.

 2014: Return to Final Four 

The 2013–14 Gators finished the SEC regular season with an 18–0 record in conference play, the first SEC team to ever accomplish the feat, after the SEC re-expanded to an 18-game regular season schedule prior to the 2012–13 season.  In doing so, the Gators won their seventh SEC championship, and their third in four seasons. The Gators then beat the Kentucky Wildcats for the third time in the season to claim their fourth SEC Tournament championship title.

By claiming the SEC tournament, the Gators earned an automatic bid to the NCAA tournament, and were selected as the No.1 overall seed, and were placed in the South Regional. The Gators' school record win streak reached 30 as they defeated their first four tournament opponents by double digits, finally breaking through in the Elite 8 with a 62-52 win over Dayton to advance to the Final Four as the only remaining No.1 seed. In the national semifinals, Florida faced Connecticut, which had been the last team to defeat them back on December 2, 64–65. The Gators got off to a quick start and built a 16–4 lead, but the Huskies were able to catch up and led 25–22 at halftime in a defensive battle. The Gators continued to struggle to score in the second half and suffered their third (and worst) loss of the season, 53–63.Box Score, ESPN.com.

The team's program-best 36–3 record resulted in many individual honors. Billy Donovan was named the SEC's Coach of the Year for the third time. Senior point guard Scottie Wilbekin was named Southeastern Conference Men's Basketball Player of the Year, the SEC Tournament MVP, and the Most Outstanding Player of the NCAA South region. Senior center Patric Young was named the Defensive Player and Scholar-Athlete of the Year, junior forward Dorian Finney-Smith was named Sixth Man of the Year, and senior guard Casey Prather was named to the All-SEC First Team.

 2015: First losing record in 17 years 

The 2014–15 Gators finished the season 16–17, 8–10 in SEC play to finish in a tie for eighth place.  They did not participate in a postseason tournament for the first time in 17 years.  The woeful season included losses to in-state rivals Miami and Florida State, and three losses to SEC champion Kentucky.  The Gators' 63.7 points-per-game were their lowest in the 19-year coaching tenure of Billy Donovan.  After the season, Donovan accepted an offer to coach the NBA's Oklahoma City Thunder.  He would leave Florida as far and away the winningest coach in program history. He led the Gators to 14 NCAA tournament appearances, six SEC regular season titles (four outright, two shared) and four SEC Tournament championships–in all three cases, more than all other coaches in program history combined.

 Mike White era 
On May 7, 2015, former Louisiana Tech head coach Mike White was hired to coach the Gators, succeeding Billy Donovan.  White played point guard at Ole Miss and later served as an assistant there for seven seasons.  He is a native of the state of Florida and had led Louisiana Tech to three straight conference titles.

In his first season at the helm, he led Florida to a 21–15 record and a berth in the NIT Tournament, defeating North Florida and Ohio State in the first two rounds before losing to eventual-NIT champion George Washington in the quarterfinal. White's second Gator squad was the best of his tenure, as Florida went 24–7, finished 2nd in the SEC standings, and earned a #4 seed in the 2017 NCAA tournament. They reached the Elite Eight on a three point buzzer beater by guard Chris Chiozza to beat Wisconsin, then were upset one game short of the Final Four by SEC rival South Carolina, 77–70.

Florida earned invitations to four straight NCAA tournaments and won at least one game in each appearance under White (not counting the 2020 NCAA tournament, which was cancelled due to the COVID-19 pandemic). However, after 2017, they earned a decreasing number of wins each season, were never a serious contender for SEC championships, and had a 10-15 record in games played in March. After a disappointing 2021-22 season in which Florida did not earn a berth in the NCAA tournament, White left to become the head coach at Georgia.

 Todd Golden era 
On March 18, former San Francisco head coach Todd Golden was named Florida's new head basketball coach.

 Head coaches 

 Championships 

 NCAA national championships 

The Florida Gators have won two NCAA national championships, which is tied for 9th all-time among Division I schools. The Gators won two national championships in 2005–06, and 2006–07 under Billy Donovan. That was the first time any team had won back-to-back national championships since Duke did it in 1991–92, and no Division I men's team has accomplished this since. In addition, the Gators became the first school to ever win a national championship in football and basketball in both the same calendar year and the same academic year (the Gators' football team defeated Ohio State in the 2007 BCS National Championship Game).

 SEC Tournament championships 

The Gators have won four SEC Tournament championships, all under Billy Donovan, including three in a row from 2005-2007.

 SEC Championships 

Though the automatic berth in the NCAA Tournament is given to the conference tournament winner, the SEC declares the team with the best record in the regular season the "official" conference champion. The Gators have won a total of seven official (regular season) SEC championships. Norm Sloan won the first one during the 1988–89 season, and Billy Donovan has won the other six, including the 2006–07 season in which the Gators also won the SEC Tournament championship and NCAA national championship, and three in a four-year span from 2011–2014.

The 2013–14 squad became the first team in SEC history to have an 18–0 regular season conference record.

Complete postseason results

NCAA tournament results
Florida has appeared in the NCAA tournament 22 times. Their combined record is 48–20. However, their appearances in 1987 and 1988 have been vacated by the NCAA making their official record 45–18. They were NCAA National Champions in 2006 and 2007.

* Vacated by the NCAA

NCAA Tournament seeding historyThe NCAA began seeding the tournament with the 1979 edition.NIT results
The Gators have appeared in the National Invitation Tournament (NIT) 12 times. Their combined record is 14–14.

 Final Fours 

The Florida Gators have been to five Final Fours, which is tied for 17th all time among Division I schools.

Lon Kruger took the Gators to their first one in 1994. Florida received the No.3 seed in the East Region (played in Miami). The Gators swept through the region with victories over 14th seeded James Madison, 11th seeded Pennsylvania, 2nd seeded Connecticut and punched their ticket to their first ever Final Four by knocking off the upstart, 9th seeded Boston College. But the Gators then lost to Duke in the national semifinals.

Billy Donovan took them back six years later in 2000, winning the East Region (played in Syracuse, New York) as the No.5 seed. To get to the Final Four, Florida first had to survive a tough test from 12th seeded Butler in the first round in Winston-Salem, North Carolina. Trailing 68–67 with time running out, the Gators won on a last second shot by Mike Miller. After that initial test, Florida ran through the rest of the region, easily defeating 4th seeded Illinois, top seeded Duke, and 3rd seeded Oklahoma State to reach the Final Four, where they defeated North Carolina in the semifinals, but lost to Michigan State in the national championship game.

Donovan would get Florida back to the Final Four in 2006, winning the Minneapolis Regional as the No.3 seed with victories over 14th seeded South Alabama, 11th seeded UW-Milwaukee, 7th seeded Georgetown and top seeded Villanova in the Regional Final. The Gators proceeded to knock off upstart George Mason (who won the Washington, D.C. Regional as the No.11 seed) in the semifinals and then handily defeated UCLA in the championship game for their first ever national championship.

The next year, Donovan's Gators would make it not only back to back Final Fours, but back to back national championships as well. They received the top seed in the St. Louis Regional, and defeated 16th seeded Jackson State, 9th seeded Purdue, 5th seeded Butler and 3rd seeded Oregon in the Regional Final to earn a trip to their 4th Final Four. There, they dispatched UCLA in the semifinals and then Ohio State in the title game.

Over the next decade, Florida reached the doorstep of the Final Four several times but were usually turned away. From 2011–2014, the Gators made four consecutive trips to the Elite Eight. Florida held late leads in the first two of them, but could never finish the game and lost each time, first to Butler, then to Louisville, before Michigan blew them out in their third straight Elite 8. Florida finally broke through against Dayton in their fourth straight Regional final appearance and moved on to play eventual 2014 national champions Connecticut in the Final Four, where they were defeated 63–53. After a two year absence from the NCAA Tournament, Mike White got them back to the Elite Eight in 2017, where the Gators were again defeated, this time by SEC rival South Carolina.

 Home courts 

All-Americans

Florida Gators basketball players who have been recognized as All-Americans include:

 Neal Walk, center; AP Second Team; NABC Third Team; UPI Third Team (1968)
 Neal Walk, center; AP Third Team; NABC; UPI Third Team (1969)
 Udonis Haslem, center; AP Third Team (2001)
 Al Horford, forward-center; AP Third Team; NABC Second Team (2007)
 Joakim Noah, forward-center; AP Consensus Second Team; NABC Second Team; USBWA Second Team (2007)
 Scottie Wilbekin, point guard; AP Third Team; NABC Third Team; Sporting News Third Team (2014)

SEC Player of the Year

Two Florida Gators have been recognized as the SEC Player of the Year:
 Chandler Parsons, small forward (2011)
 Scottie Wilbekin, point guard (2014)

Retired numbers

Florida has retired one jersey number.

2006–07 NCAA championship starting five
 Corey Brewer, small forward, Most Outstanding Player of the 2007 Final Four.
 Taurean Green, point guard.
 Al Horford, center; now five-time NBA All-Star center with the Boston Celtics.
 Lee Humphrey, shooting guard, all-time leader for three-point shots made in the NCAA Tournament and all-time leading three-point scorer at Florida.
 Joakim Noah, power forward, Most Outstanding Player of the 2006 Final Four; former NBA All-Star center and 2014 NBA Defensive Player of the Year with the Chicago Bulls.

Donovan's 2004 recruiting class won two consecutive NCAA championships in 2006 and 2007. The group nicknamed themselves "the 04s" (pronounced "oh-fours") since they enrolled at Florida in 2004. They were known for their camaraderie on and off the court, as Brewer, Green, Horford and Noah were roommates during their entire time in college. All five starters and sixth man Chris Richard later played professionally. All of them, except Humphrey, were selected in the 2007 NBA draft. Brewer, Horford and Noah were selected in the top 10, while Richard and Green were selected in the second-round.

Gators currently in the NBA

 Bradley Beal (Washington Wizards)
 Chris Chiozza (Golden State Warriors)
 Dorian Finney-Smith (Dallas Mavericks)
 Udonis Haslem (Miami Heat)
 Al Horford (Boston Celtics)
Tre Mann (Oklahoma City Thunder)

Gators currently in international basketball

 Kerry Blackshear Jr. (born 1997), player in the Israeli Basketball Premier League
John Egbunu (born 1994), Nigerian-born American player for Hapoel Jerusalem of the Israeli Basketball Premier League
Kenny Kadji (born 1988), Cameroonian player in the Israeli Basketball Premier League
Egor Koulechov (born 1994), Israeli-Russian player for Israeli team Ironi Nahariya
Casey Prather (born 1991), player in the Israeli Basketball Premier League
 Alex Tyus (born 1988), American-Israeli player, also plays for the Israeli national basketball team
Scottie Wilbekin (born 1993), Turkish-American player in the Israeli Basketball Premier League

See also

 Florida Gators
 Florida Gators Dazzlers
 Florida Gators women's basketball
 Florida–Kentucky men's basketball rivalry
 History of the University of Florida
 List of Florida Gators in the NBA
 List of University of Florida Athletic Hall of Fame members
 University Athletic Association
 Florida-Florida State men's basketball rivalry

References

Bibliography
 Dortch, Chris,  String Music: Inside the Rise of SEC Basketball, Brassey's, Inc., Dulles, Virginia (2002).  .
 Koss, Bill, Pond Birds: Gator Basketball, The Whole Story From The Inside'', Fast Break Press, Gainesville, Florida (1996).  .

External links
 

 
Basketball teams established in 1915
1915 establishments in Florida